Perpetual motion is the motion of bodies that continues forever in an unperturbed system. A perpetual motion machine is a hypothetical machine that can do work infinitely without an external energy source. This kind of machine is impossible, as it would violate either the first or second law of thermodynamics, or both.

These laws of thermodynamics apply regardless of the size of the system. For example, the motions and rotations of celestial bodies such as planets may appear perpetual, but are actually subject to many processes that slowly dissipate their kinetic energy, such as solar wind, interstellar medium resistance, gravitational radiation and thermal radiation, so they will not keep moving forever.

Thus, machines that extract energy from finite sources will not operate indefinitely, because they are driven by the energy stored in the source, which will eventually be exhausted. A common example is devices powered by ocean currents, whose energy is ultimately derived from the Sun, which itself will eventually burn out. 

In 2016, new states of matter, time crystals, were discovered in which on a microscopic scale the component atoms are in continual repetitive motion, thus satisfying the literal definition of "perpetual motion". However, these do not constitute perpetual motion machines in the traditional sense or violate thermodynamic laws because they are in their quantum ground state, so no energy can be extracted from them; they exhibit motion without energy.

History

The history of perpetual motion machines dates back to the Middle Ages. For millennia, it was not clear whether perpetual motion devices were possible or not, but the development of modern theories of thermodynamics has shown that they are impossible. Despite this, many attempts have been made to construct such machines, continuing into modern times. Modern designers and proponents often use other terms, such as "over unity", to describe their inventions.

Basic principles 

There is a scientific consensus that perpetual motion in an isolated system violates either the first law of thermodynamics, the second law of thermodynamics, or both. The first law of thermodynamics is a version of the law of conservation of energy. The second law can be phrased in several different ways, the most intuitive of which is that heat flows spontaneously from hotter to colder places; relevant here is that the law observes that in every macroscopic process, there is friction or something close to it; another statement is that no heat engine (an engine which produces work while moving heat from a high temperature to a low temperature) can be more efficient than a Carnot heat engine operating between the same two temperatures.

In other words:

 In any isolated system, one cannot create new energy (law of conservation of energy). As a result, the thermal efficiency—the produced work power divided by the input heating power—cannot be greater than one. 
 The output work power of heat engines is always smaller than the input heating power. The rest of the heat energy supplied is wasted as heat to the ambient surroundings. The thermal efficiency therefore has a maximum, given by the Carnot efficiency, which is always less than one.
 The efficiency of real heat engines is even lower than the Carnot efficiency due to irreversibility arising from the speed of processes, including friction.

Statements 2 and 3 apply to heat engines. Other types of engines that convert e.g. mechanical into electromagnetic energy, cannot operate with 100% efficiency, because it is impossible to design any system that is free of energy dissipation.

Machines that comply with both laws of thermodynamics by accessing energy from unconventional sources are sometimes referred to as perpetual motion machines, although they do not meet the standard criteria for the name. By way of example, clocks and other low-power machines, such as Cox's timepiece, have been designed to run on the differences in barometric pressure or temperature between night and day. These machines have a source of energy, albeit one which is not readily apparent, so that they only seem to violate the laws of thermodynamics.

Even machines that extract energy from long-lived sources - such as ocean currents - will run down when their energy sources inevitably do. They are not perpetual motion machines because they are consuming energy from an external source and are not isolated systems.

Classification 
One classification of perpetual motion machines refers to the particular law of thermodynamics the machines purport to violate:
 A perpetual motion machine of the first kind produces work without the input of energy. It thus violates the first law of thermodynamics: the law of conservation of energy.
 A perpetual motion machine of the second kind is a machine that spontaneously converts thermal energy into mechanical work. When the thermal energy is equivalent to the work done, this does not violate the law of conservation of energy. However, it does violate the more subtle second law of thermodynamics in a cyclic process (see also entropy). The signature of a perpetual motion machine of the second kind is that there is only one heat reservoir involved, which is being spontaneously cooled without involving a transfer of heat to a cooler reservoir. This conversion of heat into useful work, without any side effect, is impossible, according to the second law of thermodynamics.
A perpetual motion machine of the third kind is usually (but not always) defined as one that completely eliminates friction and other dissipative forces, to maintain motion forever due to its mass inertia (Third in this case refers solely to the position in the above classification scheme, not the third law of thermodynamics). It is impossible to make such a machine, as dissipation can never be completely eliminated in a mechanical system, no matter how close a system gets to this ideal (see examples in the Low Friction section).

Impossibility 

"Epistemic impossibility" describes things which absolutely cannot occur within our current formulation of the physical laws. This interpretation of the word "impossible" is what is intended in discussions of the impossibility of perpetual motion in a closed system.

The conservation laws are particularly robust from a mathematical perspective. Noether's theorem, which was proven mathematically in 1915, states that any conservation law can be derived from a corresponding continuous symmetry of the action of a physical system.  The symmetry which is equivalent to conservation of energy is the time invariance of physical laws.   Therefore, if the laws of physics do not change with time, then the conservation of energy follows.  For energy conservation to be violated to allow perpetual motion would require that the foundations of physics would change.

Scientific investigations as to whether the laws of physics are invariant over time use telescopes to examine the universe in the distant past to discover, to the limits of our measurements, whether ancient stars were identical to stars today. Combining different measurements such as spectroscopy, direct measurement of the speed of light in the past and similar measurements demonstrates that physics has remained substantially the same, if not identical, for all of observable time spanning billions of years.

The principles of thermodynamics are so well established, both theoretically and experimentally, that proposals for perpetual motion machines are universally met with disbelief on the part of physicists. Any proposed perpetual motion design offers a potentially instructive challenge to physicists: one is certain that it cannot work, so one must explain how it fails to work. The difficulty (and the value) of such an exercise depends on the subtlety of the proposal; the best ones tend to arise from physicists' own thought experiments and often shed light upon certain aspects of physics. So, for example, the thought experiment of a Brownian ratchet as a perpetual motion machine was first discussed by Gabriel Lippmann in 1900 but it was not until 1912 that Marian Smoluchowski gave an adequate explanation for why it cannot work. However, during that twelve-year period scientists did not believe that the machine was possible. They were merely unaware of the exact mechanism by which it would inevitably fail.

In the mid-19th-century Henry Dircks investigated the history of perpetual motion experiments, writing a vitriolic attack on those who continued to attempt what he believed to be impossible:

Techniques 

Some common ideas recur repeatedly in perpetual motion machine designs. Many ideas that continue to appear today were stated as early as 1670 by John Wilkins, Bishop of Chester and an official of the Royal Society. He outlined three potential sources of power for a perpetual motion machine, " Extractions", "Magnetical Virtues" and "the Natural Affection of Gravity".

The seemingly mysterious ability of magnets to influence motion at a distance without any apparent energy source has long appealed to inventors. One of the earliest examples of a magnetic motor was proposed by Wilkins and has been widely copied since: it consists of a ramp with a magnet at the top, which pulled a metal ball up the ramp. Near the magnet was a small hole that was supposed to allow the ball to drop under the ramp and return to the bottom, where a flap allowed it to return to the top again. However, if the magnet is to be strong enough to pull the ball up the ramp, it cannot then be weak enough to allow gravity to pull it through the hole. Faced with this problem, more modern versions typically use a series of ramps and magnets, positioned so the ball is to be handed off from one magnet to another as it moves. The problem remains the same.

Gravity also acts at a distance, without an apparent energy source, but to get energy out of a gravitational field (for instance, by dropping a heavy object, producing kinetic energy as it falls) one has to put energy in (for instance, by lifting the object up), and some energy is always dissipated in the process. A typical application of gravity in a perpetual motion machine is Bhaskara's wheel in the 12th century, whose key idea is itself a recurring theme, often called the overbalanced wheel: moving weights are attached to a wheel in such a way that they fall to a position further from the wheel's center for one half of the wheel's rotation, and closer to the center for the other half. Since weights further from the center apply a greater torque, it was thought that the wheel would rotate forever. However, since the side with weights further from the center has fewer weights than the other side, at that moment, the torque is balanced and perpetual movement is not achieved. The moving weights may be hammers on pivoted arms, or rolling balls, or mercury in tubes; the principle is the same.

Another theoretical machine involves a frictionless environment for motion. This involves the use of diamagnetic or electromagnetic levitation to float an object. This is done in a vacuum to eliminate air friction and friction from an axle. The levitated object is then free to rotate around its center of gravity without interference. However, this machine has no practical purpose because the rotated object cannot do any work as work requires the levitated object to cause motion in other objects, bringing friction into the problem. Furthermore, a perfect vacuum is an unattainable goal since both the container and the object itself would slowly vaporize, thereby degrading the vacuum.

To extract work from heat, thus producing a perpetual motion machine of the second kind, the most common approach (dating back at least to Maxwell's demon) is unidirectionality. Only molecules moving fast enough and in the right direction are allowed through the demon's trap door. In a Brownian ratchet, forces tending to turn the ratchet one way are able to do so while forces in the other direction are not. A diode in a heat bath allows through currents in one direction and not the other. These schemes typically fail in two ways: either maintaining the unidirectionality costs energy (requiring Maxwell's demon to perform more thermodynamic work to gauge the speed of the molecules than the amount of energy gained by the difference of temperature caused) or the unidirectionality is an illusion and occasional big violations make up for the frequent small non-violations (the Brownian ratchet will be subject to internal Brownian forces and therefore will sometimes turn the wrong way).

Buoyancy is another frequently misunderstood phenomenon. Some proposed perpetual-motion machines miss the fact that to push a volume of air down in a fluid takes the same work as to raise a corresponding volume of fluid up against gravity. These types of machines may involve two chambers with pistons, and a mechanism to squeeze the air out of the top chamber into the bottom one, which then becomes buoyant and floats to the top. The squeezing mechanism in these designs would not be able to do enough work to move the air down, or would leave no excess work available to be extracted.

Patents 
Proposals for such inoperable machines have become so common that the United States Patent and Trademark Office (USPTO) has made an official policy of refusing to grant patents for perpetual motion machines without a working model. The USPTO Manual of Patent Examining Practice states:

And, further, that:

The filing of a patent application is a clerical task, and the USPTO will not refuse filings for perpetual motion machines; the application will be filed and then most probably rejected by the patent examiner, after he has done a formal examination. Even if a patent is granted, it does not mean that the invention actually works, it just means that the examiner believes that it works, or was unable to figure out why it would not work.

The USPTO maintains a collection of Perpetual Motion Gimmicks.

The United Kingdom Patent Office has a specific practice on perpetual motion; Section 4.05 of the UKPO Manual of Patent Practice states:

Examples of decisions by the UK Patent Office to refuse patent applications for perpetual motion machines include:
 Decision BL O/044/06, John Frederick Willmott's application no. 0502841
 Decision BL O/150/06, Ezra Shimshi's application no. 0417271

The European Patent Classification (ECLA) has classes including patent applications on perpetual motion systems: ECLA classes "F03B17/04: Alleged perpetua mobilia ..." and "F03B17/00B: [... machines or engines] (with closed loop circulation or similar : ... Installations wherein the liquid circulates in a closed loop; Alleged perpetua mobilia of this or similar kind ...".

Apparent perpetual motion machines 
As "perpetual motion" can exist only in isolated systems, and since true isolated systems do not exist, there are no real "perpetual motion" devices. However, there are concepts and technical drafts that propose "perpetual motion", but on closer analysis it is revealed that they actually "consume" some sort of natural resource or latent energy, such as the phase changes of water or other fluids or small natural temperature gradients, or simply cannot sustain indefinite operation. In general, extracting work from these devices is impossible.

Resource consuming 

Some examples of such devices include:
 The drinking bird toy functions using small ambient temperature gradients and evaporation. It runs until all water is evaporated.
 A capillary action-based water pump functions using small ambient temperature gradients and vapour pressure differences. With the "Capillary Bowl", it was thought that the capillary action would keep the water flowing in the tube, but since the cohesion force that draws the liquid up the tube in the first place holds the droplet from releasing into the bowl, the flow is not perpetual.
 A Crookes radiometer consists of a partial vacuum glass container with a lightweight propeller moved by (light-induced) temperature gradients.
 Any device picking up minimal amounts of energy from the natural electromagnetic radiation around it, such as a solar-powered motor.
 Any device powered by changes in air pressure, such as some clocks (Cox's timepiece, Beverly Clock). The motion leeches energy from moving air which in turn gained its energy from being acted on.
 A heat pump due to it having a COP above 1.
 The Atmos clock uses changes in the vapor pressure of ethyl chloride with temperature to wind the clock spring.
 A device powered by radioactive decay from an isotope with a relatively long half-life; such a device could plausibly operate for hundreds or thousands of years.
 The Oxford Electric Bell and the  driven by dry pile batteries.

Low friction 
 In flywheel energy storage, "modern flywheels can have a zero-load rundown time measurable in years".
 Once spun up, objects in the vacuum of space—stars, black holes, planets, moons, spin-stabilized satellites, etc.—dissipate energy very slowly, allowing them to spin for long periods. Tides on Earth are dissipating the gravitational energy of the Moon/Earth system at an average rate of about 3.75 terawatts.
 In certain quantum-mechanical systems (such as superfluidity and superconductivity), very low friction movement is possible. However, the motion stops when the system reaches an equilibrium state (e.g. all the liquid helium arrives at the same level.) Similarly, seemingly entropy-reversing effects like superfluids climbing the walls of containers operate by ordinary capillary action.

Thought experiments 
In some cases a thought (or gedanken) experiment appears to suggest that perpetual motion may be possible through accepted and understood physical processes. However, in all cases, a flaw has been found when all of the relevant physics is considered. Examples include:
 Maxwell's demon: This was originally proposed to show that the Second Law of Thermodynamics applied in the statistical sense only, by postulating a "demon" that could select energetic molecules and extract their energy. Subsequent analysis (and experiment) have shown there is no way to physically implement such a system that does not result in an overall increase in entropy.
 Brownian ratchet: In this thought experiment, one imagines a paddle wheel connected to a ratchet. Brownian motion would cause surrounding gas molecules to strike the paddles, but the ratchet would only allow it to turn in one direction. A more thorough analysis showed that when a physical ratchet was considered at this molecular scale, Brownian motion would also affect the ratchet and cause it to randomly fail resulting in no net gain. Thus, the device would not violate the laws of thermodynamics.
 Vacuum energy and zero-point energy: In order to explain effects such as virtual particles and the Casimir effect, many formulations of quantum physics include a background energy which pervades empty space, known as vacuum or zero-point energy. The ability to harness zero-point energy for useful work is considered pseudoscience by the scientific community at large. Inventors have proposed various methods for extracting useful work from zero-point energy, but none have been found to be viable, no claims for extraction of zero-point energy have ever been validated by the scientific community, and there is no evidence that zero-point energy can be used in violation of conservation of energy.
Ellipsoid paradox: This paradox considers a perfectly reflecting cavity with two black bodies at points A and B. The reflecting surface is composed of two elliptical sections E1 and E2 and a spherical section S, and the bodies at A and B are located at the joint foci of the two ellipses and B is at the center of S. This configuration is such that apparently black body at B heat up relative to A: the radiation originating from the blackbody at A will land on and be absorbed by the blackbody at B. Similarly, rays originating from point B that land on E1 and E2 will be reflected to A. However, a significant proportion of rays that start from B will land on S will be reflected back to B. This paradox is solved when the black bodies' finite sizes are considered instead of punctual black bodies.

Conspiracy theories 

Despite being dismissed as pseudoscientific, perpetual motion machines have become the focus of conspiracy theories, alleging that they are being hidden from the public by corporations or governments, who would lose economic control if a power source capable of producing energy cheaply was made available.

See also 
 Anti-gravity
 Faster than the speed of light
 Incredible utility
 Johann Bessler
 Pathological science
 Time machine

Notes

References

External links 

 
 The Museum of Unworkable Devices 
 
 "Perpetual Motion - Just Isn't." Popular Mechanics, January 1954, pp. 108–111.
 In Our Time: Perpetual Motion, BBC discussion with Ruth Gregory, Frank Close and Steven Bramwell, hosted by Melvyn Bragg, first broadcast 24 September 2015.

 

 
Pseudoscience